Brandi Michele Hitt (born January 7, 1980) is a former reporter and anchor for ABC 7 in Los Angeles. She previously worked for NewsOne, the affiliate news service operated by ABC News.

References

External links
KABC-TV official biography
LinkedIn profile
Disney ABC Press biography
"Brandi Hitt Departs KTLA for ABC NewsOne"

ABC News personalities
American television news anchors
California State University, Fresno alumni
Journalists from California
Living people
1980 births